Triphosphorus pentanitride is an inorganic compound with the chemical formula . Containing only phosphorus and nitrogen, this material is classified as a binary nitride. While it has been investigated for various applications this has not led to any significant industrial uses. It is a white solid, although samples often appear colored owing to impurities.

Synthesis 
Triphosphorus pentanitride can be produced by reactions between various phosphorus(V) and nitrogen anions (such as ammonia and sodium azide): 

The reaction of the elements is claimed to produce a related material. Similar methods are used to prepared boron nitride (BN) and silicon nitride; however the products are generally impure and amorphous.

Crystalline samples have been produced by the reaction of ammonium chloride and hexachlorocyclotriphosphazene or phosphorus pentachloride.

 has also been prepared at room temperature, by a reaction between phosphorus trichloride and sodium amide.

Reactions 

It has been suggested that these compounds may have applications as solid electrolytes and pigments.

Structure and properties 
Several polymorphs are known for triphosphorus pentanitride. The alpha‑form of triphosphorus pentanitride (α‑) is encountered at atmospheric pressure and exists at pressures up to 11 GPa, at which point it converts to the gamma‑variety (γ‑) of the compound. Upon heating γ‑ to temperatures above 2000 K at pressures between 67 and 70 GPa, it transforms into δ-. The release of pressure on the δ- polymorph does not revert it back into γ‑ or α‑. Instead, at pressures below 7 GPa, δ- converts into a fourth form of triphosphorus pentanitride, α′‑.

The structure of all polymorphs of triphosphorus pentanitride was determined by single crystal X-ray diffraction.  α‑ and α′‑ are formed of a network structure of  tetrahedra with 2- and 3-coordinated nitrides, γ‑ is composed of both  and  polyhedra while δ- is composed exclusively of corner- and edge-sharing  octahedra. δ- is the most incompressible triphosphorus pentanitride, having a bulk modulus of 313 GPa.

Potential applications 
Triphosphorus pentanitride has no commercial applications, although it found use as a gettering material for incandescent lamps, replacing various mixtures containing red phosphorus in the late 1960s. The lighting filaments are dipped into a suspension of  prior to being sealed into the bulb. Much of this is removed by the pump but enough  vapor remains to react with any residual oxygen inside the bulb. The high decomposition temperature of  allows sealing machines to run faster and hotter than was possible using red phosphorus.

Related halogen containing polymers, trimeric bromophosphonitrile  (melting point 192 °C) and tetrameric bromophosphonitrile  (melting point 202 °C) find similar lamp gettering applications for tungsten halogen lamps, where they perform the dual processies of gettering and precise halogen dosing.

Triphosphorus pentanitride has also been investigated as a semiconductor for applications in microelectronics, particularly as a gate insulator in metal-insulator-semiconductor devices.

As a fuel in pyrotechnic obscurant mixtures, it offers some benefits over the more commonly used red phosphorus, owing mainly to its higher chemical stability. Unlike red phosphorus,  can be safely mixed with strong oxidizers, even potassium chlorate. While these mixtures can burn up to 200 times faster than state-of-the-art red phosphorus mixtures, they are far less sensitive to shock and friction. Additionally,  is much more resistant to hydrolysis than red phosphorus, giving pyrotechnic mixtures based on it greater stability under long-term storage.

Patents have been filed for the use of triphosphorus pentanitride in fire fighting measures.

See also
 Polyphosphazene

References 

Nitrides
Inorganic phosphorus compounds
Solids